Buky Canyon is a canyon near the Buky village, on the Hirskyi Tikych river in the Cherkasy Oblast (province) of Ukraine.

References

External links
 Site Urban-type settlement Buky
 Buky Canyon on Hyrskyi Tikich
 Video "Buky Canyon in 4K (Ultra HD)"

Geography of Cherkasy Oblast
Canyons and gorges of Ukraine
Landmarks in Cherkasy Oblast